Color of money may refer to:

 The Color of Money, a 1986 drama featuring Paul Newman and Tom Cruise
 The Color of Money, a 1984 book by Walter Tevis
 The Colour of Money (game show), a British game show
 Color of money, a term used in government procurement